Hazradanga Shahidullah High School is a secondary school located in Hazradanga Road under Debiganj Upazila of Panchagarh District, Bangladesh. The school is managed and administered by the Directorate of Secondary and Higher Education, under the guidance of the Ministry of Education and the Government of Bangladesh. It was founded in 1996 by philanthropist Al-Haj Md. Shahidullah (aka Shyamol).

References

Schools in Panchagarh District
High schools in Bangladesh
Dinajpur Education Board